Rucava Municipality is a former municipality in Courland, Latvia. The municipality was formed in 2009 by merging Dunika Parish and Rucava Parish, the administrative centre being Rucava. The population in 2020 was 1,451.

Rucava Municipality ceased to exist on 1 July 2021, when it was merged into the newly-formed South Kurzeme Municipality.

See also 
 Administrative divisions of Latvia (2009)

References 

 
Former municipalities of Latvia